"London" is a song by American rappers Bia and J. Cole, released on April 8, 2022. The song was produced by AzizTheShake, Jon Glass and Tim Nihan.

Background
On the day the song was released, J. Cole revealed some details behind his collaboration with Bia on Instagram:

"I Asked BIA to come through the studio for some whole other shit. First time meeting her. We chop it up. She plays me this new song she had just did. [...] in that moment I was blown away. 

I thought about this song for a month straight, it was my favorite song and I only heard it one time. She hit me recently and sent me the song (she musta knew I wanted to hear it again!!!) and I was just grateful to have it in my possession. When the thought and conversation came up about me adding a verse, I was excited but genuinely nervous cuz I didn’t even see how the song could be better after what she did to it. I didn't want to fuck nothing up! I'm grateful I Ended up catching the right wave"

Bia told Rolling Stone, "We really wanted to capture, celebrate and highlight London culture, while staying authentic to who we are. I definitely got in my London accent bag and people actually tell me it's really good."

Composition
"London" is a UK drill-influenced song that sees Bia and J. Cole rapping in British accents and slang. Bia raps about her luxury shopping, while J. Cole later name-drops Heathrow Airport, Ringo Starr, The O2 Arena, and Elizabeth II in his verse and references American rapper T.I.'s new career as a stand-up comedian.

Music video
The music video was directed by Daps and filmed in London. In the clip, Bia shops in luxury stores of the city, parades down a sidewalk flanked by two Dalmatians, and has a tea party. After that, she cruises down the River Thames on a speedboat with J. Cole, who also gets his height measured while hanging upside down. The video features appearances of landmarks such as the Big Ben, as well as cameos from British rapper Unknown T and British model Leomie Anderson.

Charts

References

2022 singles
2022 songs
Bia (rapper) songs
J. Cole songs
Songs written by J. Cole
Epic Records singles
Songs about London